John Frederick Matthews, FBA, FSA, FRHistS (born 1940) is a British historian and academic. Since 1996, he has been Professor of Roman History at Yale University, where he was also John M. Schiff Professor of Classics and History from 2001 to 2014.

Career 
Born in 1940, Matthews was educated at The Queen's College, Oxford, completing undergraduate studies there and earning a DPhil in 1970. He held the Dyson Junior Research Fellowship in Greek Culture at Balliol College, Oxford, from 1965 to 1969, and was then elected an official fellow of Corpus Christi College, Oxford. He returned to The Queen's College in 1976, when he was elected a fellow. At the University of Oxford, he was also a lecturer in Middle and Later Roman History from 1969 to 1990, when he was promoted to a readership; he was promoted again in 1992, to a personal chair as Professor of Late Roman History. Matthews left both The Queen's College and the University of Oxford in 1996 to take up a professorship of Roman History at Yale University, where he was also John M. Schiff Professor of Classics and History from 2001 to 2014.

Honours and awards 
Matthews was elected a Fellow of the Royal Historical Society in 1986, a Fellow of the British Academy (the United Kingdom's national academy for the humanities) in 1990, and a Fellow of the Society of Antiquaries of London in 1993. He was awarded an honorary DLitt by the University of Leicester in 2003.

Publications 

 Western Aristocracies and Imperial Court, A.D. 364–425 (Oxford University Press, 1975).
 (Co-authored with Tim Cornell) Atlas of the Roman World (Phaidon, 1982).
 Laying Down the Law: A Study of the Theodosian Code (Yale University Press, 2000).
 The Journey of Theophanes: Travel, Business, and Daily Life in the Roman East (Yale University Press, 2006).
 The Roman Empire of Ammianus Marcellinus (Johns Hopkins University Press/Duckworth, 1989; 2nd ed., Michigan Classical Press, 2007).
 Roman Perspectives: Studies on Political and Cultural History, from the First to the Fifth Century (Classical Press of Wales, 2010).

References 

Living people
1940 births
Alumni of The Queen's College, Oxford
Fellows of Balliol College, Oxford
Fellows of Corpus Christi College, Oxford
Fellows of The Queen's College, Oxford
Academics of the University of Oxford
Yale University faculty
Fellows of the British Academy
Fellows of the Society of Antiquaries of London
Fellows of the Royal Historical Society
British expatriates in the United States